Komadine is a Serbian toponym that may refer to:

Komadine, Ivanjica, a village in the municipality of Ivanjica, Serbia
Komadine, Prijepolje, a village in the municipality of Prijepolje, Serbia